Charles Esterly Severn (July 5, 1872 – December 14, 1929), of Chicago, Illinois, was a philatelist who dedicated his entire career as editor of philatelic publications.

Philatelic literature
At Mekeel's Weekly Stamp News, founded by Charles Haviland Mekeel, Severn was initially assigned as the Chicago correspondent in 1894. In 1898 Severn became editor and part-owner for the remainder of his life. During his tenure at Mekeel's Weekly Stamp News, the periodical published a number of significant philatelic monographs and articles, and purchased the competing philatelic journal Weekly Philatelic Era which now became part of the Mekeel company. In 1915 Charles Severn, W. W. Jewett, and Willard Otis Wylie formed the Severn-Wylie-Jewett Company, with Severn as president. The venture was successful and, when Severn died, his wife Eveleen Mary Weldon Severn took over as president of the company.

Philatelic activity
At the Chicago Philatelic Society Severn was a member since 1887, and served a number of posts within the society. He was named a Life Director in 1912.

Honors and awards
Severn signed the Roll of Distinguished Philatelists in 1921. He was named to the American Philatelic Society Hall of Fame in 1941.

See also
 Philately
 Philatelic literature

References

 Charles Esterly Severn

1872 births
1929 deaths
Philatelic literature
American philatelists
People from Chicago
Signatories to the Roll of Distinguished Philatelists
American Philatelic Society